Ana Kokkinos is an Australian film and television director and screenwriter of Greek descent.  She is known for her breakthrough feature film, Head On (1998), and has also directed television shows such as The Secret Life of Us and The Time of Our Lives.

The Guardian wrote, of her work: "Kokkinos's cinematic oeuvre is among the most hard-hitting bodies of work in Australian cinema."

Early life and education 
Kokkinos was born in Melbourne and prior to her career in film, she worked as an industrial lawyer. 

In 1991, she was accepted into the Victorian College of the Arts' graduate film and television programme.

Career

Early work 
Kokkinos' career began with a short black and white film she directed while in her first year of film school, Antamosi (1992), which examines a migrant family's relationship which is told from the perspective of three generations of women. Coming from a Greek immigrant family herself, Kokkinos's work often deals with themes of identity and family.

Her next film was the 50-minute short feature Only The Brave (1994), which won several awards. This film follows Alex as she helplessly watches her best friend Vicki fall victim to her self-destructive tendencies.

1998–1999: Breakthrough with Head On 
In her feature-length work, Head On (1998), Kokkinos explores the relationship between the city and the individual. Similar to a "road movie" (i.e. Mad Max, 1979) where the narrative follows the protagonists journey to their destination, a "street movie" follows the protagonist as they wander urban streets. Head On follows Greek-Australian teenager Ari as he wanders the streets of Melbourne. Ari is struggling with his identity as a gay male and the identity his family wishes to thrust upon him.

Head On divided the Greek community in Australia Kokkinos said in an interview with the LA Times. Kokkinos said "what it did is that it opened up a dialogue between younger Greeks and their parents. What the film has done is that it has broken down barriers."

The film was adapted from the novel Loaded which was written by Christos Tsiolkas. Head On received numerous awards from around the globe including Best First Feature in the San Francisco International Lesbian and Gay Film Festival as well as Best Film at the Milan International Lesbian and Gay Film Festival.

2000s–present: Further work 
Her next film The Book of Revelation (2006) was also adapted form a novel of the same name written by Rupert Thomson. This film continues the street movie theme developed in Head On. In The Book of Revelation the main protagonist, Daniel, leaves his house to buy cigarettes but is abducted by three masked women who then subject him to physical and emotional abuse. The women also repeatedly rape Daniel. The Book of Revelation was nominated by the Australian Film Institute for Best Screenplay.

Blessed (2009) deals with the complex relationship between mother and child and occurs during the span of 24 hours. Blessed was nominated by the Australian Film Institute for Best Adapted Screenplay in 2009.

In May 2022, the BBC and STAN commissioned a new series to be directed by Kokkinos, Ten Pound Poms, a drama about the British citizens who migrated to Australia after the Second World War, with filming commencing in Australia shortly after.

Personal life 
Kokkinos realised she was gay at the age of 15. In an interview with the Los Angeles Times she said, "I went through a very long process of having to come to terms with that, and that wasn't easy, but I don't think it's easy for anyone". However she rejects the tag "lesbian filmmaker", saying that she is  able to represent all kinds of characters on screen.

Selected filmography 
 Anatamosi (1992)
Only the Brave (1994)
 Head On (1998)
 The Book of Revelation (2006)
 Blessed (2009)
 The Hunting (2019 TV mini-series)
 Here Out West  (co-director, with Leah Purcell and others)

See also 
 List of female film and television directors
 List of lesbian filmmakers
 List of LGBT-related films directed by women

References

External links

1958 births
Living people
Australian women film directors
Australian women screenwriters
Australian lesbian artists
Australian lesbian writers
LGBT film directors
LGBT television directors
Lesbian screenwriters
Australian people of Greek descent
Australian LGBT screenwriters
Film directors from Melbourne
Women television directors
20th-century Australian screenwriters
20th-century Australian women writers
20th-century Australian LGBT people
21st-century Australian screenwriters
21st-century Australian women writers
21st-century Australian LGBT people